Roseville is an unincorporated community in Barren County, Kentucky, United States. Landrum, which is listed on the National Register of Historic Places, is located in Roseville.

References

Unincorporated communities in Barren County, Kentucky
Unincorporated communities in Kentucky